James Alexander Marchbank (17 August 1878 – 6 January 1959) was an Australian rules footballer who played for Carlton in the Victorian Football League (VFL).

Jim Marchbank was born James Alexander Hanson, the second son of James Trickett Hanson (a Danish immigrant) and Janet Scott. After his father's death in 1880, his mother married John William Marchbank and James inherited the Marchbank name. The family lived in Woods Point and worked in the timber industry.

Marchbank was already 24 when he came to Carlton but he soon established a place in the side as both a ruckman and centre half forward. He participated in Carlton's 1904 Grand Final loss and took a break from the sport in 1905 as the Woods Point recruit was struggling to adapt to life in Melbourne.

In 1906 he returned to the game and was a centre half forward in their premiership team that year as well as in 1908. He however missed the 1907 flag due to a suspension for striking in an encounter against South Melbourne late in the season. Marchbank played in further Grand Finals in 1909 and 1910 but finished on the losing team in both.

In 1915, Marchbank transferred to Hawthorn in the Victorian Football Association along with his half-brother Bill and made four appearances before the competition went into recess during World War I.

Marchbank married Ellen Mary Roche in 1920 and worked in the timber industry until his death in 1958.

References

External links

1878 births
Australian rules footballers from Victoria (Australia)
Carlton Football Club players
Carlton Football Club Premiership players
Hawthorn Football Club (VFA) players
Australian people of Danish descent
1959 deaths
Two-time VFL/AFL Premiership players